Polyptychus chinensis, the Chinese crenulate hawkmoth, is a moth of the family Sphingidae. It is known from China, Taiwan and the Ryukyu Archipelago.

Description 
The wingspan is 92–112 mm.

Subspecies
Polyptychus chinensis chinensis (Taiwan and the southern Ryukyu Archipelago)
Polyptychus chinensis draconis Rothschild & Jordan, 1916 (Central to southwestern China)
Polyptychus chinensis draconoides Mell, 1935 (Central to eastern China)
Polyptychus chinensis shaanxiensis Brechlin, 2008 (Shaanxi)

References

Polyptychus
Moths described in 1903
Moths of Japan